Haliotrema is a genus of flatworms belonging to the family Ancyrocephalidae.

The species of this genus are found in Pacific Ocean and America.

Species:

Haliotrema abaddon 
Haliotrema acanthuri 
Haliotrema alatum 
Haliotrema allornata 
Haliotrema amanses 
Haliotrema amplimacrohamus 
Haliotrema ampliocuspidis 
Haliotrema angelopterum 
Haliotrema angulocirrus 
Haliotrema arsiosa 
Haliotrema auribaculum 
Haliotrema aurigae 
Haliotrema aurigae 
Haliotrema australe 
Haliotrema balisticus 
Haliotrema banana 
Haliotrema bifurcocirrus 
Haliotrema bihamulatum 
Haliotrema bilobatum 
Haliotrema bisegmentatum 
Haliotrema bodiani 
Haliotrema breve 
Haliotrema brevicirrus 
Haliotrema brevicornigerum 
Haliotrema brevispirocirrus 
Haliotrema brotulae 
Haliotrema caballeroi 
Haliotrema caesiopercae 
Haliotrema canescens 
Haliotrema caraibense 
Haliotrema centropygis 
Haliotrema chelicirrus 
Haliotrema chenhsintaoi 
Haliotrema chromidis 
Haliotrema cirrhitusi 
Haliotrema conspecta 
Haliotrema cornutum 
Haliotrema cromileptis 
Haliotrema crymanum 
Haliotrema ctenochaeti 
Haliotrema cumanense 
Haliotrema curvicirrus 
Haliotrema curvipenis 
Haliotrema dascyllusi 
Haliotrema daurai 
Haliotrema dempsteri 
Haliotrema dicollinum 
Haliotrema diplotaenia 
Haliotrema discalariforme 
Haliotrema dongshaense 
Haliotrema eilatica 
Haliotrema eilaticum 
Haliotrema epinepheli 
Haliotrema flagellatum 
Haliotrema flagellocirrus 
Haliotrema flexicirrus 
Haliotrema geminatohamula 
Haliotrema glandulosum 
Haliotrema golvani 
Haliotrema gruinale 
Haliotrema guadeloupense 
Haliotrema hatampo 
Haliotrema holocentri 
Haliotrema indicum 
Haliotrema japonense 
Haliotrema johnstoni 
Haliotrema kritskyi 
Haliotrema kusafugu 
Haliotrema lactophrys 
Haliotrema lactoriae 
Haliotrema leporinus 
Haliotrema lineati 
Haliotrema longiangusticirrus 
Haliotrema longicornigerum 
Haliotrema longirectocirrus 
Haliotrema macracantha 
Haliotrema magnihamus 
Haliotrema minutospirale 
Haliotrema minutum 
Haliotrema mugilis 
Haliotrema myripritisi 
Haliotrema nanhaiense 
Haliotrema neobilobatum 
Haliotrema nigrofusci 
Haliotrema obesum 
Haliotrema ornatum 
Haliotrema pachycirra 
Haliotrema pacificum 
Haliotrema palmatum 
Haliotrema papillibaculum 
Haliotrema parahaliotrema 
Haliotrema parvihamus 
Haliotrema pempherii 
Haliotrema pervagoris 
Haliotrema pollexinus 
Haliotrema polyspirotubiferum 
Haliotrema pratasense 
Haliotrema priacanthi 
Haliotrema pseudupenei 
Haliotrema pteroisi 
Haliotrema pterophallus 
Haliotrema rameshwarense 
Haliotrema rectangulare 
Haliotrema recurvatum 
Haliotrema saezae 
Haliotrema sanchezae 
Haliotrema scari 
Haliotrema scyphovagina 
Haliotrema serpenticirrus 
Haliotrema shanweii 
Haliotrema sigmoidocirrus 
Haliotrema spariensis 
Haliotrema spiculare 
Haliotrema spinicirrus 
Haliotrema spirale 
Haliotrema spirophallus 
Haliotrema subtilihamula 
Haliotrema surculocirrus 
Haliotrema susanae 
Haliotrema swatowense 
Haliotrema tachypliformis 
Haliotrema tenucirrus 
Haliotrema tenuihamus 
Haliotrema teuthis 
Haliotrema tiegsi 
Haliotrema torridum 
Haliotrema triacanthi 
Haliotrema triostegum 
Haliotrema trochaderoi 
Haliotrema tuberobaculum 
Haliotrema tubulovagina 
Haliotrema umbraculiferum 
Haliotrema upenei 
Haliotrema weberii 
Haliotrema xesuri 
Haliotrema youngi 
Haliotrema zancli 
Haliotrema zanclus 
Haliotrema zebrasoma 
Haliotrema zigmoidocirrus

References

Platyhelminthes